Keren Tendler (September 26, 1979 - August 12, 2006) was Israel's first female helicopter flight mechanic soon after a court allowed women to serve in combat positions.

She was the first female Israeli soldier to die on active duty since the killing of Keren Ya’akobi in Hebron in December 2002. Tendler was killed during the 2006 Israel-Lebanon conflict, along with four other crew members, when their helicopter, a CH-53 Sea Stallion Yas'ur, was shot down upon lifting off in Lebanon. A fund was established in her name to help other young women become flight mechanics.

References

External links

1979 births
2006 deaths
2006 Lebanon War
Israeli Air Force personnel
Women in 21st-century warfare
Israeli female military personnel
Israeli people of Romanian-Jewish descent
People from Rehovot